Dunnes Stores is an Irish multinational retail chain that primarily sells food, clothes and household wares.
It was founded by Ben Dunne in 1944.
In addition to its main customer base in Ireland, the chain also has operations in Spain, and formerly in England and Scotland. The format of most of the chain's stores on the island of Ireland involves a grocery supermarket operating alongside a clothing/textiles store, although some stores contain only textiles, and some contain only a supermarket. The grocery side of the business does not operate outside of Ireland, save for a limited grocery range in the Spanish stores. The larger stores usually contain a café branded as either Café Sol, Dunnes Stores Café or Baxter & Greene Market Café.

Dunnes Stores' original own brand of groceries was sold under the St Bernard brand introduced in 1956, becoming an Irish household name, but was rebranded as "My Family Favourites" in 2013.

The main domestic competitors in the supermarket business are Tesco, SuperValu, Lidl and Aldi. For many years, Dunnes Stores has maintained a top-three market share in Ireland's grocery market, alongside SuperValu and Tesco. Combined, these three supermarket chains account for approximately 70% of Ireland's grocery market.

In clothing, their rivals include Penneys, and Marks and Spencer. 
Dunnes collaborate for many clothing/home wares collections from a number of Irish designers such as Paul Costelloe, Padraic Harrington, Carolyn Donnelly, Lennon Courtney and new clothing from Paul Galvin.
They also sell in-house clothings brands such as Savida and Gallery, along with their own Dunnes Stores brand of clothing.

History

1940s–1950s
Ben Dunne began his retail career as an employee at Anderson's drapery shop in Drogheda, Ireland, in 1926. In the mid-1930s, Dunne moved to Roches Stores in Cork. He rose to become a senior buyer for Roches Stores. When he was asked to oversee Roches' entire drapery business, he agreed on condition that he receive a pay rise. The owners refused, noting that he would be earning more than any of them. Dunne decided to leave Roches Stores and set up his own business.

Dunne opened his first drapery shop on Patrick Street, Cork on 31 March 1944, promising "better value" by offering goods at pre-war prices. 

Dunnes introduced its own-brand range in 1956, then branded as St Bernard.

Through the 1950s, Dunne established stores in Wexford, Waterford, Limerick and Dublin, with the first Dublin shop being opened on Henry Street in 1957.

1960s–1970s

Dunne opened a large shop on South Great George's Street, Dublin in 1960. This shop allowed customers to browse through items on racks before making a purchase, which was new to Irish retail.

Dunnes continued to expand during the 1960s, and in 1963, Dunne grouped his growing number of stores under a new corporate structure, Dunnes Holding Company, which took over ownership of the entire operation. He also set up a family trust at the same time, in part to ensure that the company remained family controlled.

In the middle of the decade Dunne sparked a new revolution in the Irish retail scene. Until then, the company's stores had operated, like the country's retail sector in general, in Ireland's city centre. In 1965, however, Dunnes opened a store at Cornelscourt in what was then Ireland's first out-of-town shopping centre. Although scoffed at by experts, who believed the company would fail at the new location, the Cornelscourt site was not only a success, but became one of the company's flagship stores.

By the end of the 1960s, Dunnes operated 17 stores across Ireland. The company remained intensely private and, despite an active advertising schedule, wary of publicity. As Ben Dunne explained, in what the Times described as a rare interview in 1971, "If there is one thing I hate it is publicity. No one is allowed to write about Ben Dunne. The people I do not like are the people who talk about what they have done and the people who talk about what they are going to do." In that same interview, Dunne reaffirmed his commitment to maintaining family control of his business, saying: "Public companies are like the government. The government has the privilege of spending money foolishly and public companies are no better."

Dunnes added its first store in Northern Ireland in 1971. The company continued to expand its retail business, and by the end of the 1970s, it had built up a network of more than 60 stores.

1980s–1990s

By the beginning of the 1980s, the company operated seven stores in Northern Ireland. By that point, Dunnes had made a move onto the European continent, opening a store in Spain, in Costa del Sol, in 1980. The success of that venture led the company to begin construction on its second Spanish store the following year, which opened in Marbella.

By 1981, Dunnes Stores represented 66 locations, producing estimated sales revenues of some £200,000,000. Dunne, by then in his 70s, had succeeded in building his company into one of Ireland's top ten firms. Dunne also had been joined by his five children, Frank, Margaret, Teresa, Elizabeth, and, especially, youngest son Bernard Dunne Jr. The company became swept up in political events in 1982 when Ben Dunne Jr., was kidnapped and held captive for several days by the IRA.

Ben Dunne died of a heart attack at 4pm on 14 April 1983. Although the business was nominally handed to all five of his children, most of whom played an active role in the company's operations, actual leadership of the company became the responsibility of his son, Ben Dunne Jr.

Dunnes expanded into England in 1986.

Ben Dunne's tenure as leader of the family business came to an end in 1992, when he was arrested for cocaine possession in a Florida hotel.
The resulting scandal led the other family members to oust their brother, resulting in a somewhat public battle among the otherwise publicity-shy family.
In order to quantify and document the financial dealings of her brother, Margaret Heffernan commissioned a report from Price Waterhouse accountants, which was eventually disclosed in the legal case between the Dunne siblings (and which eventually lead to the McCracken Tribunal). In the end, the company paid IR£100 million to buy out Ben Dunne's share of the business. The family faced other tragedies, as sisters Teresa and Elizabeth both died at relatively young ages.

In the meantime, the alleged unorthodoxy of Ben Dunne's business practices, which included funnelling Dunnes Stores funds into the offshore bank accounts of a number of Irish political figures, brought the company once again into the limelight in the late-1990s. The resulting political scandal had an additional consequence for the very private company, when the government announced in 1997 that it would appoint an authorised officer to inquire into the company's business practices under Ben Dunne.

Dunnes faced other difficulties as well during the decade. The UK retail giant Tesco had entered the Irish market and gained steadily, capturing the number one retail spot away from Dunnes. At the same time, a new breed of deep-discount supermarket, led by German Aldi and Lidl chains, had arrived in Ireland, placing Dunnes' own discount formula under pressure.

2000s–2020

By the start of the 2000s, Dunnes' network had grown to more than 120 stores. It expanded into the Scottish market in 2000, opening a shop in Glasgow.

In 2000, it launched a new store format, adapting the American-style convenience store concept for the Dublin market. By 2001, the company had opened a second store featuring the smaller format and had registered a new subsidiary name, Better Value Conveniently Yours Ltd., in what some observers saw as the company's intent on expanding its convenience store operations. In the meantime, Dunnes continued to open new stores, bringing its total to 125 stores. After entering Scotland for the first time in 2000, the company announced its intention to boost the number of Dunnes stores in the United Kingdom by up to 25 by 2005.

The company was said to have held buyout talks in 2000 with U.S. retail giant Wal-Mart, which had expressed an interest in entering Ireland. The Dunne family, however, declined and decided to retain control of their business.

In 2003, the Irish government appointed an authorised officer to look into Dunnes Stores' records. While the results of that investigation were to remain private, it nevertheless represented a new intrusion for the company's carefully guarded privacy. That same desire for privacy had reportedly led the company to quash a story slated to appear about Dunnes Stores in the Irish Independent, which allegedly chose not to run the story in order to safeguard the yearly €1.6 million in advertising revenues provided by Dunnes Stores.

In 2007, Dunnes refurbished its shop at Henry Street, Dublin. Also in 2007, architect Arthur Gibney & Partners designed a large commercial development on South Great George’s Street, Dublin as Headquarters for Dunnes Stores, which entailed the removal of some buildings and facade retention of several others, including the former Dunlop Factory on Stephen Street, and the Connolly Shoes building. The building has a dramatic glass corner atrium leading to an internal street through the development. The facade to George’s Street respects existing building heights.

The company owns 50% of the Asian fast-food chain, Neon.

In spring 2018, Dunnes Stores confirmed the closure of all stores in England and Scotland, limiting their UK presence to Northern Ireland only.

In 2018, Dunnes Stores commenced with a number of substantial refurbishments and expansions on some of its stores, including its stores in Bishopstown and Ballyvolane in Cork and in a number of stores in Dublin including Donaghmede, Blanchardstown and Swords. The refurbished supermarkets now contain a number of concessions including James Whelan Butchers, Sheridan’s Cheesemongers and Baxter & Greene Markets Delis.

In 2019, new stores opened in Naas, Ilac Centre and the refurbishment of stores in the Jetland and Briarhill. Also in 2019, Dunnes Stores celebrated 75 years of business. The refurbished Jetland store included Dunnes Stores's first beauty department.

Dunnes Stores introduced a voucher scheme known as “Shop & Save”, whereby customers who spend between €25 and €50 receive a €5 voucher for their next shop, and customers who spend €50 or more receive a €10 voucher for their next shop.

In March 2020, Dunnes Stores introduced priority shopping for the elderly and vulnerable between 11:00-13:00, in response to the high volume of customer traffic in the mornings, a result from the COVID-19 pandemic where panic buying became an issue across Ireland. Dunnes Stores also implement a strict social distancing policy in all stores.

Controversies

South Africa boycott

In 1984, Mary Manning, a shop worker in the Henry Street, Dublin branch, made international headlines when she led a picket for almost three years against the sale by Dunnes of oranges sourced from South Africa, then governing under a system of apartheid, in which Ewan MacColl wrote a song about the issue. The Irish Government eventually banned all imports from South Africa until the end of apartheid, which happened between 1991-94. The workers eventually met African National Congress leader and political prisoner Nelson Mandela on the occasion of his conferral of the Freedom of the City of Dublin in 1990. A plaque presented by President of South Africa Thabo Mbeki, commemorating the action, was unveiled in Dublin in June 2008, and a street has been named after Mary in Johannesburg. Manning was invited to attend the Funeral of Nelson Mandela in 2013.

Bras for children
In September 2011, the Irish Independent found that Dunnes Stores was selling bra-and-knicker sets for three to six-year-old girls. Dunnes also has padded bras for girls with a 28 to 30-inch chest, which are the typical measurements of nine-year-old girls.

Burma boycott
An attempted boycott was made on Dunnes due to reports of selling goods made in Burma.

Mandate dispute
On 2 April 2015, members of the Mandate Trade Union had a one-day dispute at 109 branches of Dunnes Stores. The dispute concerned low-hour contracts (typically 15 hours per week), income and employment security, and the continued failure of Dunnes Stores to recognise or engage with the Mandate Trade Union, contrary to the recommendations of the Labour Court.

References

Ryan, Orla. "As its workers strike over unfair treatment, Dunnes responds with 1-day only online offer." 2 April 2015,

External links

'Newborn 1984' for Mary Manning from BLOODROOT Doire Press 2017) by poet Annemarie Ni Churreain republished by Summer 2017 The Stinging Fly

Department stores of Ireland
Retail companies of Ireland
Supermarkets of Northern Ireland
Supermarkets of the Republic of Ireland
Companies based in Dublin (city)
1944 establishments in Ireland
Clothing retailers of England
Clothing retailers of Scotland
Clothing retailers of Spain
Retail companies established in 1944
Clothing retailers of Ireland
Clothing companies of Ireland